The discography for Graveworm, an Italian melodic black metal band, consists of one demo album, two extended plays, nine studio albums, one video album and one compilation album.

Graveworm signed with Serenades records in 1997 before recording any material. They then released their demo, their first extended play and studio album, Eternal Winds and When Daylight's Gone, in the same year followed by their second extended play and their first video album, Underneath the Crescent Moon and Awaiting the Shining, the year after. Towards the end of 1999 they released their second studio album As the Angels Reach the Beauty and then their third studio album Scourge of Malice (2001), alongside the joint re-release of When Daylight's Gone and Underneath The Crescent Moon later that year before singing to Nuclear Blast records. Their first release under Nuclear Blast was Engraved in Black (2003), their fourth studio album. Two years later they released their fifth studio album, (N)utopia, their sixth studio album, Collateral Defect (2007), their seventh studio album Diabolical Figures (2009), their eighth studio album Fragments Of Death (2011) and their most recent studio album Ascending Hate (2015).

Studio albums

Compilations

Demos and extended plays

Videos

Music videos

References

External links
Official discography
Graveworm at Discogs
[ Graveworm] at Allmusic

Heavy metal group discographies
 
Discographies of Italian artists